Stadthausbrücke is an underground railway station, on the City S-Bahn line of the Hamburg S-Bahn. The station is located in New Town quarter of the Hamburg borough of Mitte (centre), Germany. The station is managed by DB Station&Service.

History 
In October 1967, the work the city tunnel line from central station to Altona station started. On  — at the start of the summer schedule — the Hamburg S-Bahn opened Stadthausbrücke station, within the line from central station to Landungsbrücken station.

Layout 
The station is an underground island platform with 2 tracks and two exits. The station is now accessible for handicapped persons, because a lift has been installed,  however there is no special floor layout for blind persons. In case of war it also has its function as a fallout-shelter for 4,500 persons like the Reeperbahn and Harburg-Rathaus stations, too.

Services

Trains  
The rapid transit trains of the lines S1, S2 and S3 of the Hamburg S-Bahn are calling the station. Direction of the trains on track 1 is Wedel (S1), Hamburg-Altona (S2) and Pinneberg (S3). On track 2 the trains are traveling in the direction Poppenbüttel (S1), Bergedorf (S2) and Stade (S3) via Hamburg central station.

Facilities 
No personnel is attending the station, but there are SOS and information telephones, and ticket machines.

See also 

 Hamburger Verkehrsverbund (HVV)
 List of Hamburg S-Bahn stations

References

External links 

 Line and route network plans by hvv.de 

Hamburg S-Bahn stations in Hamburg
Railway stations in Germany opened in 1975
Railway stations located underground in Hamburg
Buildings and structures in Hamburg-Mitte
1975 establishments in West Germany